Joseph Mewis (born 23 March 1931) is a Belgian wrestler. He was Olympic silver medalist in Freestyle wrestling in 1956. He also competed at the 1952, 1960 and 1964 Olympics.

References

External links

1931 births
Living people
Olympic wrestlers of Belgium
Wrestlers at the 1952 Summer Olympics
Wrestlers at the 1956 Summer Olympics
Wrestlers at the 1960 Summer Olympics
Wrestlers at the 1964 Summer Olympics
Belgian male sport wrestlers
Olympic silver medalists for Belgium
Olympic medalists in wrestling
Medalists at the 1956 Summer Olympics
20th-century Belgian people